Zoran Stojadinović (Serbian Cyrillic: Зоран Стојадиновић; born 25 April 1961 in Šabac) is a Serbian former footballer, currently a players agent.

Club career
The 1990–91 season saw Deportivo finishing as runners-up, finally achieving promotion to La Liga after an 18-year absence. Stojadinovic scored the two goals against Real Murcia during the last game 2–0 with Deportivo.

Honours
As a player:
  Rapid Wien
1 time Austrian Football Bundesliga Champion: 1987–88
1 time Austrian Football Bundesliga top-scorer: 1987–88 (27 goals in 32 matches)

Post-playing
After finishing his playing career, Stojadinović began working as players agent. He mostly dealt in transfers of Serbian players to, from, and within Spain. The very first transfer Stojadinović handled was Jovan Stanković's move from Red Star Belgrade to Real Mallorca in 1996.

In November 2012, he accepted an administrative position with Red Star Belgrade, becoming the club's new sporting director. However, he was sacked on 13 February 2014 by club management.

References

External links
 Profile and Rapid stats at Rapidarchiv.at
 
 Zoran Stojadinović at WorldFootball.net 
 
 Spanish career story at Perso.Wanadoo.es 
 
 lavozdegalicia.es

Living people
1961 births
Footballers from Belgrade
Yugoslav footballers
Serbian footballers
Serbian expatriate footballers
HNK Rijeka players
FK Zemun players
OFK Beograd players
FC Admira Wacker Mödling players
SK Rapid Wien players
Austrian Football Bundesliga players
Expatriate footballers in Austria
Yugoslav expatriate sportspeople in Austria
RCD Mallorca players
Deportivo de La Coruña players
UE Figueres footballers
La Liga players
Segunda División players
Expatriate footballers in Spain
Serbian expatriate sportspeople in Spain
Association football forwards
Serbian sports agents
Yugoslav expatriate footballers
Yugoslav expatriate sportspeople in Spain